Rawalpindi was a first-class cricket side that competed in domestic competitions in Pakistan. Rawalpindi's List A and Twenty20 sides were known as the Rawalpindi Rams.

Honours
 Patron's Trophy (1) 
 1980-81 (not first-class in that season)
 Quaid-i-Azam Trophy (1)
 2013-14

Rawalpindi also reached the final of the Ayub Trophy in 1967-68 (losing to Karachi Blues), the Punjab Governor's Gold Cup Tournament in 1971-72 (losing to Punjab University), and the BCCP Patron's Trophy in 1984-85 (losing to Karachi Whites) and 1988-89 (losing to Karachi).

Playing record

1950s and 1960s
Rawalpindi played their first two matches in 1958-59 in the Quaid-i-Azam Trophy, drawing the first and winning the second against Peshawar. Munir Malik took 21 wickets in the two matches for 136 runs; on top of his 12 for 39 against Peshawar he scored 35 not out, which was the highest score in the match, a crucial element of the 28-run victory.

In 1961-62 Rawalpindi won three of their four matches in the Quaid-i-Azam Trophy, Munir Malik taking 31 wickets at 12.93 and Javed Akhtar 22 at 10.77. Malik took 12 for 84 in the match against Peshawar, while Akhtar took 12 for 117 against Combined Services.

In 1962-63 Rawalpindi reached the semi-finals of the Quaid-i-Azam Trophy, thanks largely to the bowling of the captain, Maqsood Ahmed, who took 34 wickets in the four matches at 9.29 (including 13 for 83 against Sargodha), and Mohammad Sabir, 28 at 11.42. Rawalpindi also reached the semi-finals in 1963-64.

In 1967-68 Rawalpindi reached the final of a competition for the first time, this time in the Ayub Trophy, losing by 10 wickets to Karachi Blues. Again the bowling was the team's strength. No batsman scored a century, but Javed Akhtar led the bowling with 24 wickets at 13.08 in the four matches.

1970s and 1980s
The six-team Punjab Governor's Gold Cup Tournament was held only once, in 1971-72, and Rawalpindi reached the final, losing to Punjab University. After a few years playing in other tournaments Rawalpindi returned to the Quaid-i-Azam Trophy in 1979-80, then took part in the expanded BCCP Patron's Trophy in 1983-84. They reached the semi-finals in 1983-84, when Mohammad Riaz took 13 for 59 in one of the preliminary matches against Lahore Division.

In 1980-81 they won the Patron's Trophy, winning all five of their group matches, receiving a walkover in their semi-final, and beating Karachi Blues in the final by eight wickets. However, the matches were later downgraded in status and are no longer considered to have been first-class.

The Patron's Trophy returned to first-class status in 1983-84. In 1984-85 Rawalpindi were beaten in the final by Karachi Whites. They reached the semi-finals in 1986-87. In 1988-89, after winning four of their seven matches, they played off in the final against Karachi, losing by 191 runs. Their leading player was Raja Sarfraz, who took 35 wickets at 16.45, including 12 for 120 against Multan.

1990s and 2000s
Rawalpindi reached the semi-finals of the Quaid-i-Azam Trophy in 1991-92 and 1993-94. In 1998-99 they drew a match against the touring Australians, Shakeel Ahmed taking 10 wickets and Naved Ashraf scoring 48 and 115 not out. They again reached the semi-finals of the Quaid-i-Azam Trophy in 2002-03, and continued thereafter to have reasonable success, without reaching the finals. In 2004-05 Bazid Khan, in one of the seven matches he played for Rawalpindi, hit Rawalpindi's highest-ever score, 300 not out, against Hyderabad. In 2009-10 Rashid Latif took 9 for 42 against Islamabad, which remained the Rawalpindi record for only two years.

2010s
In 2010-11 Rawalpindi finished third in Division One of the Quaid-i-Azam Trophy, with six wins from their 11 matches. Sadaf Hussain took 64 wickets at 16.12, including five or more wickets in an innings eight times, with match figures of 11 for 118 against Zarai Taraqiati Bank and 11 for 104 against Faisalabad. In 2011-12 they slipped to seventh, with four wins from 11 matches. Hussain was again the outstanding player, with 53 wickets at 20.37. He set two bowling records for Rawalpindi in the match against Habib Bank Limited when he took 9 for 37 in the first innings and 15 for 154 in the match. Habib Bank Limited nevertheless won by 131 runs. In 2012-13 Rawalpindi finished at the top of Group II, and were promoted into Group I for the 2013-14 season.

2013-14
Led by Babar Naeem, who captained the team for several seasons, Rawalpindi began the 2013-14 Quaid-i-Azam Trophy by defeating Bahawalpur by an innings and 130 runs. They then beat Abbottabad by eight wickets, drew with Peshawar, beat Sialkot by four wickets, and drew with Lahore Ravi. In their next match they thrashed Karachi Blues by an innings and 140 runs, dismissing them for 51 in the second innings; Nasir Malik took 5 for 108 and 6 for 17.

Progressing into Super Eight Group B, Rawalpindi drew against Lahore Shalimar, beat Sialkot again, this time by nine wickets, and drew against Multan, finishing at 345 for 9 in pursuit of 430 to win. As they were the only team in their group to win a match, they progressed to the final.

At the Gaddafi Stadium in Lahore, Islamabad won the toss and sent Rawalpindi in, dismissing them early on the second day for 211. A seventh-wicket partnership of 139 between Awais Zia and Zahid Mansoor produced the bulk of Rawalpindi's runs. Rawalpindi then dismissed Islamabad for 175 just before stumps on the second day, Nasir Malik taking four wickets. The opener Shoaib Nasir dominated the Rawalpindi second innings, scoring 177, his highest score in first-class cricket, off 296 balls. He and Babar Naeem added 159 for the fourth wicket off 39 overs. When Rawalpindi were all out for 398, Islamabad needed 435 to win in just under a day and a half, but they lost a wicket in the first over and continued to lose wickets regularly until they were all out for 206, giving Rawalpindi victory by 228 runs. Akhtar Ayub took 5 for 67, giving him eight wickets for the match. Shoaib Nasir won the player of the match award.

Other Rawalpindi teams
Sometimes two teams from Rawalpindi competed in the same season. Rawalpindi Greens played in the Quaid-i-Azam Trophy in 1964-65 and the Ayub Trophy and Patron's Trophy in 1969-70 and 1970-71 (eight matches in all). Rawalpindi Blues played five matches in the Ayub Trophy and Patron's Trophy in 1969-70 and 1970-71. Rawalpindi Yellows played two matches in the Quaid-i-Azam Trophy in 1964-65. Rawalpindi A and Rawalpindi B both competed in the Quaid-i-Azam Trophy in 1994-95 and 1995–96, each playing 17 matches; of the two matches between the two teams, Rawalpindi A won one and one was drawn.

Altogether these divided teams have played 48 matches, with 11 wins, 15 losses and 22 draws.

Overall first-class record
Rawalpindi's first-class playing record, excluding the divided teams above, was 355 matches, 126 wins, 103 losses and 126 draws.

Players 

Notable players to represent Rawalpindi include:

Waqar Younis
Inzamam-ul-Haq
Azhar Mahmood
Shoaib Akhtar  
Mohammad Akram
Sohail Tanvir
Mohammad Wasim
Yasir Arafat
Najaf Shah
Sadaf Hussain
Hammad Azam 
Babar Naeem played most matches for Rawalpindi at first-class level, 126.

Grounds
Until 1986 Rawalpindi played their home matches at the Pindi Club Ground in Rawalpindi. Most of their subsequent matches were played at either the Rawalpindi Cricket Stadium or the Khan Research Laboratories Ground in Rawalpindi.

References

External links
 Rawalpindi records at CricketArchive

Other sources
 Wisden Cricketers' Almanack 1960 to present

Pakistani first-class cricket teams